Slot Car Rides are amusement park rides that are propelled by an onboard electric motor through a slot car track.

Disney invented the technology, first implemented in 1999, with Test Track at Epcot. Test Track was a success, and they followed it up with Journey to the Center of the Earth at Tokyo DisneySea in 2001, and again with Radiator Springs Racers at Disney California Adventure in 2012.

References

Amusement rides by type